Leopoldo López (born 1971), is the Venezuelan opposition leader

Leopoldo López may also refer to:
Leopoldo López Escobar (1940-2003), Chilean geochemist
Leopoldo López Gil (born 1944), Venezuelan-Spanish politician, and the father of the opposition leader

See also
Leo López (disambiguation)